Eric Johannes (born 6 July 1962) is a former South African international lawn and indoor bowler.

He won a bronze medal in the triples with Gidion Vermeulen and Neil Burkett at the 2006 Commonwealth Games in Melbourne.

He lives in New South Wales in Australia and plays for the Warilla Bowls Club.

References

External links
 
 

1962 births
Living people
South African male bowls players
Commonwealth Games medallists in lawn bowls
Commonwealth Games bronze medallists for South Africa
Bowls players at the 2006 Commonwealth Games
Medallists at the 2006 Commonwealth Games